The 2012 Big Ten Conference men's soccer tournament was the 22nd postseason tournament to decide the Big Ten Conference champion and guaranteed representative into the 2012 NCAA Division I Men's Soccer Championship. The tournament was held at Northwestern University in Evanston, Illinois.

Bracket

Schedule

Quarterfinals

Semifinals

Final

Statistical leaders

See also 
 Big Ten Conference Men's Soccer Tournament
 2012 Big Ten Conference men's soccer season
 2012 NCAA Division I Men's Soccer Championship
 2012 NCAA Division I men's soccer season

References

External links 
 Big Ten Men's Soccer Championship Central

Big Ten Men's Soccer Tournament
Tournament
Big Ten Men's Soccer Tournament
Big Ten Men's Soccer Tournament